Sapouy is the capital of the province of Ziro in Burkina Faso. It is the capital of Ziro Province. The town is on the N6 highway which connects the national capital, Ouagadougou and Léo, the capital of Sissili Province.

References 

Populated places in the Centre-Ouest Region
Ziro Province